The United Kingdom maintains an embassy in Tashkent, and its current ambassador to Uzbekistan is . Uzbekistan maintains an embassy in London, and its current ambassador to the United Kingdom is Otabek Akbarov.

Embassy of the United Kingdom, Tashkent

The Embassy of the United Kingdom in Tashkent is the chief diplomatic mission of the United Kingdom in Uzbekistan. The Embassy is located on Gulyamov Street, in the Mirzo Ulugbek district. The current British Ambassador to Uzbekistan is Timothy Torlot. Diplomatic relations were established on 18 February 1992. The Embassy also represents the British Overseas Territories in Uzbekistan.

The United Kingdom recognized the Republic of Uzbekistan on 31 December 1991.

See also
List of Ambassadors of the United Kingdom to Uzbekistan
List of diplomatic missions in Uzbekistan

External links
UK Government on Uzbekistan
Official website of the United Kingdom's Embassy to Uzbekistan

References

 
Uzbekistan
Bilateral relations of Uzbekistan